Sam Smith is an English singer and songwriter. Born in London, England, Smith rose to fame in October 2012 when they were featured on Disclosure's breakthrough single "Latch". In December 2013, Sam was nominated for the 2014 BRIT Critics' Choice Award and the BBC's Sound of 2014 poll, both of which they won. Sam released their debut studio album, In the Lonely Hour, in May 2014 on Capitol Records. Subsequently, the album attained international success and won several awards, including Best Pop Vocal Album, Best New Artist, Record of the Year, Song of the Year, and nominations for Album of the Year and Best Pop Solo Performance at the 57th Annual Grammy Awards. Smith has won four Grammy Awards, three Brit Awards, three Billboard Music Awards, an American Music Award as well as a Golden Globe and an Academy Award through their career.

Academy Awards
The Academy Awards, or Oscars, is an annual American awards ceremony honoring cinematic achievements in the film industry, and is organised by the Academy of Motion Picture Arts and Sciences (AMPAS). Smith has been awarded once.

!
|-
! scope="row"|2016
|"Writing's on the Wall"
|Best Original Song
|
| align=center|

American Music Awards 
The American Music Awards (AMAs) is an annual music awards show created by Dick Clark in 1973. Smith has received one award from five nominations.

!
|-
!scope="row" rowspan="2"| 2014
|rowspan=4| Sam Smith
|New Artist of the Year
|
|rowspan=2 style="text-align:center;"|
|-
| Favorite Pop/Rock Male Artist
| 
|-
!scope="row" rowspan=3| 2015
| Artist of the Year
| 
|rowspan=3 style="text-align:center;"|

|-
| Favorite Pop/Rock Male Artist
| 
|-
| In the Lonely Hour
| Favorite Pop/Rock Album
| 
|}

APRA Music Awards 
The APRA Music Awards in Australia are annual awards to celebrate excellence in contemporary music, which honour the skills of member composers, songwriters and publishers who have achieved outstanding success in sales and airplay performance. Smith has received one nomination.

ARIA Music Awards
The ARIA Music Awards are presented annually by the Australian Recording Industry Association to recognize achievements in the Australian music industry. Smith has received two nominations.

!
|-
!scope="row"| 2015
|rowspan=2|Sam Smith
|rowspan=2|International Artist of the Year
|
| style="text-align:center;"|
|-
!scope="row"| 2018 
|
| style="text-align:center;"|
|}

Attitude Awards
The Attitude Awards is hosted by British magazine Attitude to honor the LGBT+ community and its allies.

!Ref.
|-
!scope="row"| 2019
| Sam Smith
| Person of the Year
| 
|

BBC Music Awards
The BBC Music Awards are the BBC's inaugural pop music awards, first held in December 2014, as a celebration of the musical achievements over the past 12 months. Smith has received two nominations.

!
|-
!scope="row" rowspan="2"| 2014
| Sam Smith
| British Artist of the Year
| 
| rowspan="2" style="text-align: center;"|
|-
|"Money on My Mind"
| Song of the Year
| 
|}

BBC Radio 1 Teen Awards
The BBC Radio 1 Teen Awards is an award show by the British radio station BBC Radio 1 to honor the top artists in music and acting of the year. Smith has received two nominations.

!
|-
!scope="row" rowspan=2|2014
|rowspan=2|Sam Smith
|Best British Solo Artist
|
|rowspan=2 style="text-align:center;"|
|-
|Best Breakthrough Award 
|
|}

BBC Sound of...
Sound of... is an annual BBC poll of music critics and industry figures to find the most promising new music talent. Smith has received one award.

!
|-
!scope="row"|2014
|Sam Smith
|Sound of 2014
|
|style="text-align:center;"|
|}

BET Awards
The BET Awards were established in 2001 by the Black Entertainment Television network to celebrate African Americans and other minorities in music, acting, sports, and other fields of entertainment. Smith has received one award.

!
|-
!scope="row"| 2015 
|Sam Smith
|Best New Artist
|
|style="text-align:center;"|
|}

Billboard Awards

Billboard Music Awards
The Billboard Music Awards are held to honor artists for commercial performance in the U.S., based on record charts published by Billboard. The awards are based on sales data by Nielsen SoundScan and radio information by Nielsen Broadcast Data Systems. The award ceremony was held from 1990 to 2007, until its reintroduction in 2011. Smith has received three awards from thirteen nominations.

!
|-
!scope="row" rowspan=13|2015
|rowspan=7|Sam Smith
|Top Artist
|
|rowspan=13 style="text-align:center;"|
|-
| Top New Artist
| 
|-
| Top Male Artist
| 
|-
| Top Billboard 200 Artist
| 
|-
| Top Hot 100 Artist
| 
|-
| Top Radio Songs Artist
| 
|-
| Top Digital Songs Artist
| 
|-
| In the Lonely Hour
| Top Billboard 200 Album
| 
|-
|rowspan=4| "Stay with Me"
| Top Hot 100 Song
| 
|-
| Top Radio Song
| 
|-
| Top Digital Song
| 
|-
| Top Streaming Song (Audio)
| 
|-
| "Latch"
| Top Dance/Electronic Song
| 
|}

BMI Awards
The BMI Awards are held annually by Broadcast Music, Inc. to award songwriters in various genres, including country and pop. Smith has received 25 awards.

BMI London Awards

!
|-
!scope="row" rowspan=5|2015
|“I'm Not the Only One”
|rowspan=4|Pop Award Songs
|
|rowspan=5 style="text-align:center;"|
|-
|"La La La"
|
|-
|“Latch”
|
|-
|rowspan=2|"Stay with Me"
|
|-
|Song of the Year
|
|-
!scope="row" rowspan=3|2016
|"Lay Me Down" 
|rowspan=2|Pop Award Songs
|
|rowspan=3 style="text-align:center;"|
|-
|"Like I Can"
|
|-
|"Writing's on the Wall"
|Academy Award Winner
|
|-
!scope="row"|2017
|"Stay with Me"
|Million Performance Songs
|
|style="text-align:center;"|
|-
!scope="row"|2018
|"Too Good at Goodbyes"
|Pop Award Songs
|
|style="text-align:center;"|
|-
!scope="row" rowspan=3|2020
|rowspan=2|“Dancing With A Stranger”
|Song of the Year
|
|rowspan=3 style="text-align:center;"|
|-
|rowspan=3|Pop Award Songs
|
|-
|"How Do You Sleep?"
|
|-
!scope="row" rowspan=4|2021
|"Diamonds"
|
| rowspan=5 style="text-align:center;" |
|}

BMI Pop Awards

!
|-
!scope="row" rowspan=4 |2015
|rowspan=2|“Latch”
|Publisher of the Year
|
|rowspan=4 style="text-align:center;"|
|-
|Award-Winning Songs
|
|-
|rowspan=2|"Stay with Me"
|Publisher of the Year
|
|-
|Award-Winning Songs
|
|-
!scope="row" rowspan=2|2016
|rowspan=2|“I'm Not The Only One”
|Publisher of the Year
|
| rowspan=2 style="text-align:center;"|
|-
|rowspan=4|Award-Winning Songs
|
|-
!scope="row"|2017
|"Lay Me Down" 
|
|style="text-align:center;"|

|-
!scope="row"|2020
|"Dancing With A Stranger"
|
|style="text-align:center;"|

|-
!scope="row"|2021
|"How Do You Sleep?" 
|
|style="text-align:center;"|

|}

Brit Awards
The Brit Awards are the British Phonographic Industry's (BPI) annual pop music awards. Smith has received three awards from fourteen nominations.

!
|-
!scope="row" rowspan=3| 2014
|rowspan=2|"La La La" 
|British Single of the Year 
|
|rowspan=3 style="text-align:center;"|
|-
|British Video of the Year
|
|-
|rowspan=4|Sam Smith
|Critics' Choice
|
|-
!scope="row" rowspan=6| 2015
|British Male Solo Artist
|
|rowspan=6 style="text-align:center;"|
|-
|British Breakthrough Act
|
|-
|Global Success Award
|
|-
|rowspan=2| "Stay with Me"
|British Single of the Year
|
|-
|British Video of the Year
| 
|-
| In the Lonely Hour
|British Album of the Year
| 
|-
!scope="row"| 2016
|"Writing's On The Wall"
|British Video of the Year
|
|style="text-align:center;"|
|-
!scope="row"| 2019
| Sam Smith
|British Male Solo Artist
|
|style="text-align:center;"|
|-
!scope="row"| 2020
|"Dancing with a Stranger"
|Song of the Year
|
|style="text-align:center;"|
|-
!scope="row" rowspan=2| 2023
| "Unholy" with Kim Petras
| Song of the Year
| 
| rowspan=2| 
|-
| Sam Smith
| British Pop/R&B Act
| 
|}

British LGBT Awards
The British LGBT Awards celebrate the UK's most loved LGBT personalities, innovators and companies, dubbed the "Gay Oscars" by the press. Smith has nominated twice.

!
|-
!scope="row"|2016
|rowspan=2|Sam Smith
|rowspan=2|Music Artist
|
| style="text-align:center;"|
|-
!scope="row"|2021
| 
| style="text-align:center;"| 
|-
!scope="row"|2022
|rowspan=2|Sam Smith
|rowspan=2|Music Artist
| 
| style="text-align:center;"| 

|}

Critics' Choice Movie Awards
The Critics' Choice Movie Awards are presented annually since 1995 by the Broadcast Film Critics Association for outstanding achievements in the cinema industry. Smith has received one nomination.

!
|-
!scope="row"|2016
|"Writing's On The Wall"
|Best Song
|
| style="text-align:center;"|
|}

Denver Film Critics Society
The Denver Film Critics Society (DFCS) recognizes excellence in cinema, and promote Colorado within the industry. Smith has received one nomination.

!
|-
!scope="row"|2016
|"Writing's On The Wall"
|Best Original Song
|
|style="text-align:center;"|
|}

Elle Style Awards
The Elle Style Awards are an awards ceremony hosted annually by the ELLE magazine. Smith has received one award.

!
|-
!scope="row"|2015
|Sam Smith
|Musician of the Year
|
| style="text-align:center;"|
|}

GAFFA Awards

GAFFA Awards (Denmark)
Delivered since 1991, the GAFFA Awards are a Danish award that rewards popular music by the magazine of the same name.

!
|-
| 2014
| rowspan="2"| Themself
| Best Foreign New Act
| 
| style="text-align:center;" |
|-
| 2018
| Best Foreign Solo Act
| 
| style="text-align:center;" |
|-
|}

GAFFA Awards (Sweden)
Delivered since 2010, the GAFFA Awards (Swedish: GAFFA Priset) are a Swedish award that rewards popular music awarded by the magazine of the same name.

!
|-
| 2014
| Themself
| Best Foreign New Act
| 
| style="text-align:center;" |
|-
|}

Gaygalan Awards
Since 1999, the Gaygalan Awards are a Swedish accolade presented by the QX magazine. Smith has received one nomination.

!
|-
| 2018
|"Too Good At Goodbyes"
|Best International Song
|
|style="text-align:center;"| 
|-
|}

Global Awards
The Global Awards are held by Global to honor music played on British radio stations. Smith has received one award.

!
|-
!scope="row"| 2018
|rowspan="4"|Sam Smith
|Mass Appeal Award
|
|style="text-align:center;"|
|-
!rowspan="4" scope="row"| 2019
|Best Male
|
|rowspan="4" style="text-align:center;"|
|-
|Best British Artist or Group
|
|-
|Mass Appeal Award
|
|-
|rowspan="1"|"Promises"  
|Best Song 
|
|-
!rowspan="1" scope="row"| 2020
|Sam Smith
|Best British Act
|
|rowspan="1" style="text-align:center;"|
|}

GLAAD Media Awards
The GLAAD Media Awards were created in 1990 by the Gay & Lesbian Alliance Against Defamation to "recognize and honor media for their fair, accurate and inclusive representations of the LGBT community and the issues that affect their lives." Smith has received three nominations.

!

|-

!scope="row"|2015
|rowspan=3|Sam Smith
|rowspan=3|Outstanding Music Artist
|
|style="text-align:center;"|

|-
!scope="row"|2018
|
|style="text-align:center;"|
|-
!scope="row"|2021
|
|style="text-align:center;"|
|}

Golden Globe Awards
The Golden Globe Awards is an American accolade bestowed by the 93 members of the Hollywood Foreign Press Association (HFPA), which recognizes excellence in film and television, both domestic and foreign. Smith has won once.

!
|-
!scope="row"| 2016
|"Writing's on the Wall" 
|Best Original Song
|
|style="text-align:center;"|
|}

Grammy Awards
The Grammy Awards are awarded annually by The Recording Academy of the United States for outstanding achievements in the music industry. Often considered the highest music honour, the awards were established in 1958. Smith has won five awards from seven nominations.

!
|-
!scope="row" rowspan=6| 2015
| Sam Smith
| Best New Artist
| 
|rowspan=6 style="text-align:center;"|
|-
| rowspan=2| In the Lonely Hour
| Album of the Year
|  
|-
| Best Pop Vocal Album
| 
|-
| rowspan=3| "Stay with Me" (Darkchild Version) 
| Record of the Year
| 
|-
| Song of the Year
| 
|-
| Best Pop Solo Performance
| 
|-
! scope="row" | 2023
| "Unholy"
| Best Pop Duo/Group Performance
| 
| style="text-align:center;" |
|-
|}

Guinness World Records 
The Guinness World Records is a reference book published annually, containing a collection of world records, both human achievements and the extremes of the natural world. Smith currently holds two records.

!
|-
!scope="row" rowspan="2"|2015
|In the Lonely Hour
|Most Consecutive Weeks in the UK Top 10 Album Charts (69 weeks) 
|
|rowspan=2 style="text-align:center;"|
|-
|"Writing's on the Wall"
|First James Bond theme to reach No.1 in the UK charts
|
|}

Hollywood Music in Media Awards
The Hollywood Music in Media Awards (HMMA) recognizes and honors the music of visual mediums (films, TV, movie trailers, video games, commercials, etc.). Smith has received one nomination.

!
|-
!scope="row"|2015
|"Writing's on the Wall"
|Song – Feature Film
|
|style="text-align:center;"|
|}

iHeartRadio Music Awards
The IHeartRadio Music Awards is an international music awards show founded by IHeartRadio in 2014. Smith has won one award out of eleven nominations.

!
|-
!scope="row" rowspan=4| 2015
|rowspan=2| Sam Smith
|Artist of the Year
|
|rowspan="4" style="text-align:center;"|
|-
| Best New Artist
| 
|-
|rowspan=2|"Stay with Me" 
|Song of the Year
| 
|-
| Best Lyrics
| 
|-
!scope="row" rowspan=4| 2016
|Sam Smith
| Male Artist of the Year
| 
|rowspan="4" style="text-align:center;"|
|-
| In the Lonely Hour
|Album of the Year
| 
|-
|"Writing's on the Wall"
| Best Song from a Movie
| 
|-
|"Hotline Bling"
| Best Cover Song
|  
|-
!scope="row" rowspan=2| 2020
| rowspan=2|"Dancing With A Stranger"  
|Best Collaboration
| 
|rowspan="2" style="text-align:center;"|
|-
|Best Music Video
| 
|-
!scope="row" rowspan=2| 2021
| rowspan=2|"Fix You"  
|Best Cover Song
| 
|rowspan="2" style="text-align:center;"|

|}

iHeartRadio Titanium Awards 
iHeartRadio Titanium Awards are awarded to an artist when their song reaches 1 Billion Spins across iHeartRadio Stations.

International Dance Music Awards 
The International Dance Music Award was established in 1985. It is a part of the Winter Music Conference, a weeklong electronic music event held annually. Smith has won one awards from three nominations.

!
|-
!scope="row" rowspan="3"| 2014
| rowspan="3"| "Latch"
|  Best House/Garage/Deep House Track
| 
|rowspan=3 style="text-align:center;"|
|-
| Best Featured Vocalist
| 
|-
| Best Music Video
| 
|}

Ivor Novello Awards
The Ivor Novello Awards are awarded for songwriting and composing. The awards, named after the Cardiff born entertainer Ivor Novello, are presented annually in London by the British Academy of Songwriters, Composers and Authors (BASCA). 

!
|-
!scope="row" |2014
| "Latch"
| Best Contemporary Song
| 
| 
|-
!scope="row" |2015
| "Stay with Me"
| rowspan=2|Most Performed Work
| 
| 

|-
!scope="row" |2020
| "Dancing With A Stranger"
| 
|

JUNO Awards
The Juno Awards are Canadian awards to recognize outstanding achievements in record industry. Smith has received one award.

!
|-
!scope="row"|2015
|In the Lonely Hour
|International Album of the Year
|
|style="text-align:center;"|
|}

LOS40 Music Awards
The LOS40 Music Awards (formerly Los Premios 40 Principales) is an annual awards established in 2006 by the Spanish music radio Los 40. Smith has received two awards from seven nominations.

!
|-
| 2013
| "La La La" 
| Best International Video
| 
| 
|-
| rowspan="3"| 2015
| Sam Smith
|Best International New Act
| 
| rowspan="3" style="text-align:center;"|
|-
| "Stay with Me"
| Best International Song
| 
|-
| In the Lonely Hour
| Best International Album
| 
|-
| 2019
| Sam Smith
| Best International Artist
| 
| style="text-align:center;" |

|-
!scope="row" rowspan=1|  2019
| Sam Smith
| Golden Music Award 
| 
|-
!scope="row" rowspan=1| 2021

|Love Goes|Best International Album
| 

| style="text-align:center;" |

|}

 Melon Music Awards 
The Melon Music Awards is a South Korean annual awards established in 2009.

!
|-
!scope="row"|2020
|To Die For
|Best Pop Award
|
|style="text-align:center;"|
|}

MOBO Awards
The MOBO Awards (an acronym for Music of Black Origin) were established in 1996 by Kanya King. They are held annually in the United Kingdom to recognize artists of any race or nationality performing music of black origin. Smith has received six awards from seven nominations.

!
|-
!scope="row" rowspan=3| 2013
|Sam Smith
|Best Newcomer
| 
|rowspan=3 style="text-align:center;"|
|-
|rowspan=2| "La La La"
|Best Song
|
|-
| Best Video
| 
|-
!scope="row" rowspan=4| 2014
|In the Lonely Hour|Best Album
|
|rowspan=4 style="text-align:center;"|
|-
|rowspan=2| Sam Smith
|Best Male Artist
|
|-
|Best Soul/R&B Artist
|
|-
|"Stay with Me"
|Best Song
|
|}

MTV Awards
MTV Europe Music Awards
The MTV Europe Music Awards (EMA) were established in 1994 by MTV Networks Europe to celebrate the most popular music videos in Europe. Smith has been nominated four times, winning one.

!
|-
!scope="row" rowspan=3|2014
|rowspan=2| Sam Smith
| Best Push Act
| 
|rowspan=3 style="text-align:center;"|
|-
| Best UK and Ireland Act
| 
|-
|"Stay with Me"
|Best Song
|
|-
!scope="row" | 2022
|"Unholy"
|Video for Good
|
|style="text-align:center;"|
|-
|}

MTV Italian Music Awards
The MTV Italian Music Awards, also known as TRL (Total Request Live) Awards, are held annually in Italy by MTV. Smith has received one nomination.

!
|-
!scope="row"|2015
|"Stay with Me"
|Best Video
|
|style="text-align:center;"|
|}

MTV Video Music Awards
The MTV Video Music Awards, commonly abbreviated as VMA, were established in 1984 by MTV to celebrate the top music videos of the year. Smith has received two nominations.

!
|-
!scope="row" rowspan=2| 2014
|Sam Smith
|Artist to Watch
| 
|rowspan=2 style="text-align:center;"|
|-
|"Stay with Me"
|Best Male Video
|
|}

MTV Video Music Awards Japan
The MTV Video Music Awards Japan was established in 2002 to award the music videos from Japanese and international artists. Smith has received one nomination.

!
|-
! scope="row"|2015
|"I'm Not the Only One"
|Best Male Video
| 
| style="text-align:center;"|
|}

Nickelodeon Kids' Choice Awards
The Nickelodeon Kids' Choice Awards are annual award shows launched by Nickelodeon in several countries.

American Nickelodeon Kids' Choice Awards

!
|-
!scope="row"|2015
|Sam Smith
|Favorite Male Singer
| 
| style="text-align:center;"|
|}

People's Choice Awards
The People's Choice Awards is an American awards show recognizing the people and the work of popular culture. The show has been held annually since 1975 and is voted on by the general public. Smith has received four nominations.

!
|-
!scope="row" rowspan=4|2015
|rowspan=2|Sam Smith
| Favorite Male Artist
| 
|rowspan=4 style="text-align:center;"| 
|-
| Favorite Breakout Artist
| 
|-
| "Stay with Me"
| Favorite Song
| 
|-
| In the Lonely Hour| Favorite Album
| 
|}

Q Awards
The Q Awards are the United Kingdom's annual music awards run by the music magazine Q to honour musical excellence. Winners are voted by readers of Q online, with others decided by a judging panel. Smith won the award once.

!
|-
!scope="row"| 2014
| Sam Smith
| Best New Artist
| 
| style="text-align:center;"|
|}

Queerty Awards
The Queerties are an annual awards run by the LGBT online magazine Queerty,'' In which their readers vote for the "Best of LGBTQ Media and Culture". Smith has been nominated for the award four times.

!
|-
!scope="row" rowspan=2| 2020
| Sam Smith
| Closet Door Bustdown
| 
|style="text-align:center;"|
|-
| "Dancing with a stranger" (with Normani)
| rowspan=2|Anthem
| 
| style="text-align:center;"|
|-
!scope="row"| 2021
| "Diamonds"
| 
|style="text-align:center;"|
|}

Satellite Awards
Voted for by the International Press Academy, the Satellite Awards are held annually and honor achievements in television and film. Smith has received one nomination.

!
|-
!scope="row"|2016
|"Writing's on the Wall"
|Best Original Song
|
|style="text-align:center;"|
|}

Silver Clef Awards
The Silver Clef Awards recognise and celebrate the outstanding talent of artists who through their music have touched the lives of many thousands of people.
 

!
|-
!scope="row"|2019
|Sam Smith
|Best Male
|
|style="text-align:center;"|
|}

Teen Choice Awards
The Teen Choice Awards is an annual awards show that airs on the Fox Network. The awards honor the year's biggest achievements in music, movies, sports, television, fashion and other categories, voted by teen viewers. Smith has received two nominations.

!
|-
!scope="row" rowspan=2| 2015 
| Sam Smith
|Choice Music: Male Artist
|
| rowspan=2 style="text-align:center;"|
|-
||"Lay Me Down"
|Choice Music Single: Male Artist
|
|-
!scope="row"| 2019 
| "Dancing with a Stranger" 
|Choice Music – Collaboration
|
| style="text-align:center;"|
|}

UK Music Video Awards
The UK Music Video Awards is an annual award ceremony founded in 2008 to recognise creativity, technical excellence and innovation in music videos and moving images for music. Smith has received one nomination.

!
|-
!scope="row"| 2018
|"Pray"
| Best Pop Video UK
| 
|style="text-align:center;"|
|}

Young Hollywood Awards
Presented by Young Artist Association, a non-profit organization, the Young Artist Awards are held annually to honor young performers. Smith has received one award from three nominations.

!
|-
!scope="row" rowspan=3| 2014
|"Stay with Me"
| Song of the Summer/DJ Replay
| 
|rowspan=3 style="text-align:center;"|
|-
|rowspan=2| Sam Smith
| Hottest Music Artist
| 
|-
| Breakout Music Artist
| 
|-
|}

YouTube Music Awards
The YouTube Music Awards, abbreviated as the YTMA, is an inaugural music award show presented by YouTube. Smith has received one award.

!
|-
!scope="row"|2015
|Sam Smith
|50 artists to watch
| 
| style="text-align:center;"|
|}

ZD Awards 
 Zvukovaya Dorozhka  ("sound track") is  Russia's oldest hit parade in field of popular music. Since 2003 it is presented in a ceremony in concert halls. It's considered one of the major Russian music awards.

!
|-
| 2015
| Sam Smith
| Best Foreign Act
| 
| style="text-align:center;" |
|-
|}

References

External links
 

Smith, Sam
Awards